Voyage to Italy, Complete with Love is a 1958 West German romantic comedy film directed by Wolfgang Becker and starring Paul Hubschmid, Susanne Cramer and Hannelore Schroth. It was shot at the Spandau Studios in West Berlin with extensive location shooting around Italy including  Venice, Assisi, Rome, Naples and Sorrento. The film's sets were designed by the art directors Emil Hasler and Walter Kutz.

Cast

References

Bibliography 
 Sabine Schrader & Daniel Winkler. The Cinemas of Italian Migration: European and Transatlantic Narratives. Cambridge Scholars Publishing, 2014.

External links 
 

1958 films
West German films
German romantic comedy films
1958 romantic comedy films
1950s German-language films
Films set in Italy
Films about vacationing
UFA GmbH films
Films directed by Wolfgang Becker (director, born 1910)
1950s German films
Films shot at Spandau Studios
Films shot in Italy